The 1997 ANZ Tasmanian International was a women's tennis tournament played on outdoor hard courts at the Hobart International Tennis Centre in Hobart in Australia that was part of Tier IV of the 1997 WTA Tour. It was the fourth edition of the tournament and was held from 6 through 12 January 1997. Unseeded Dominique Van Roost won the singles title.

Finals

Singles

 Dominique Van Roost defeated  Marianne Werdel-Witmeyer 6–3, 6–3
 It was Van Roost's 2nd title of the year and the 4th of her career.

Doubles

 Naoko Kijimuta /  Nana Miyagi defeated  Barbara Rittner /  Dominique Van Roost 6–3, 6–1
 It was Kijimuta's 2nd title of the year and the 4th of her career. It was Miyagi's 2nd title of the year and the 6th of her career.

References

External links
 ITF tournament edition details

 
Tasmanian International
Tas
Hobart International